Howard White was the eighth head football coach for Eastern New Mexico University in Portales, New Mexico, USA, and held that position for three seasons, from 1967 until 1969. His overall coaching record at Eastern NMU was 8 wins, 20 losses and 1 tie. This ranks him ninth at Eastern NMU in terms of total wins and 13th at Eastern NMU in terms of winning percentage.

References

Year of birth missing (living people)
Possibly living people
Eastern New Mexico Greyhounds football coaches